FX1 may refer to:
 F/X 1, a 1986 film
 Casio FX 1.0/2.0 series, a series of graphic calculators
 Paramotor Inc FX1, a powered paraglider
 Toyota FX-1, a concept car
 Yamaha FX-1, a personal watercraft

See also
 FX (TV channel), a proposed rebrand as "FX1", when "FXX" was proposed to launch as "FX2"
 FX (disambiguation)
 FXI (disambiguation)
 JavaFX version 1.0